Microplanner may refer to:

 Micro-Planner (programming language), an artificial intelligence programming language of the 1970s, a subset implementation of Planner
 MicroPlanner X-Pert, a project management software package